Esther Lipman  née Solomon (6 April 1900 – 27 January 1991), was a significant figure in the history of Adelaide. Noted for her support of various civic, cultural and charitable bodies, she was Adelaide's first woman councillor, alderman and Deputy Mayor. After the death of her husband she married another two times, being subsequently known as Esther Cook, and Lady Esther Jacobs or Lipman-Jacobs.

History
Esther Solomon was born at Robe Terrace, Medindie, South Australia the third child of the politician Vaiben Louis Solomon and his wife Alice née Cohen ( – 19 May 1954).

During the war she was honorary secretary of the Fighting Forces Comforts Fund and leader of the Auxiliary Women Police
She was president of the Hackney Free Kindergarten, and a member of the executive of the Kindergarten Union. She served as vice president, deputy chairman and acting chairman in the absence of Mrs. Stanley Verco.
The Emergency Maternity Hospital at Mile End was established largely at her instigation.
She was for many years chairman of the women's committee of the SA Lawn Tennis Association, and was with Mrs. K. L. Litchfield one of two women on the Davis Cup committee in 1952. She was a regular player with the Toorak Tennis Club and was an associate at Kooyonga.
In 1954 she succeeded Ruth Gibson as president of the National Council of Women after serving as vice-president for many years.
She was elected to the Adelaide City Council as councillor in 1956 and alderman in 1969, and served for 22 years, including a term as Deputy Lord Mayor and on occasion Acting Lord Mayor. She founded the Local Government Women's Association and was chairman of the Parks and Gardens Committee and served on the Board of Governors of the Adelaide Festival of Arts from 1962 to 1972 as a  Council representative.

Family
Esther married dentist Hyam John "Boy" Lipman (11 January 1889 – 16 March 1960) on 9 April 1919. Lipman's brother, J A Lipman, married Esther's cousin Gertrude.

They had three children:

Alice Sylvia Lipman (1920– )
Gerald John Lipman (1921–1928)
Dr Rex John Lipman, AO ED (26 April 1922 – 4 July 2015)

Her second marriage was to Harrold Cook.

Her third marriage was to Sir Roland Ellis "Raoul" Jacobs (28 February 1891 – 28 June 1981) on 30 November 1970.

Recognition
Esther Lipman was made a Member of the Order of the British Empire in the 1946 New Year's Honours list and promoted to Officer in the 1978 New Year's Honours.

She was one of eighteen women, chosen for their public service, to be received by Elizabeth II in Adelaide during the Royal Visit of 1954.

The Esther Lipman Garden, located near the Torrens Parade Ground, was created in 1990 in her honour. It features a bust in her likeness created by sculptor Ken Martin.

References 

History of Adelaide
South Australian local councillors
1900 births
1991 deaths
Jewish Australian politicians
20th-century Australian politicians
20th-century Australian women politicians
Women local councillors in Australia
Australian Officers of the Order of the British Empire
Deputy mayors of places in Australia